Leslie Fenton (12 March 1902 – 25 March 1978) was an English actor and film director. He appeared in more than 60 films between 1923 and 1945.

Early life
Fenton was born on 12 March 1902 in Liverpool, Lancashire, England. He emigrated to America with his mother, Elizabeth Carter Fenton, and his brothers when he was six years old. They sailed as steerage passengers on board the R.M.S. Celtic, which departed from Liverpool, 11 September 1909, and arrived at New York, where they were ferried over to Ellis Island for "U.S. Immigrant Inspection" on 19 September. They were quickly admitted and continued their journey by rail to join his father, shoe manufacturer's representative Richard Fenton, in Mifflin, Ohio.

Career
As a teenager, Leslie worked as an office clerk. He moved to New York and began a career on the stage. His film career began later with Fox Studios. He also directed 19 films between 1938 and 1951.

Military service
Fenton saw active service during the Second World War. In spring 1941, he was commissioned into the Royal Navy Volunteer Reserve. In 1942, as commander of a Motor Launch vessel, he took part in the St Nazaire Raid. He was injured in the raid and spent months convalescing in Devon, England. Unable to return to sea, he was assigned to a desk job at the War Office.

Personal life
He married American actress Ann Dvorak in 1932. Dvorak (Anna May McKim) moved to Britain with Fenton while he served in the British armed forces during the Second World War. The union was childless and ended in divorce in 1945. Fenton died 25 March 1978 in Montecito, California, aged 76. Some sources, including IMDb, incorrectly cite Frank Fenton, the noted screenwriter and novelist, as his younger brother. Frank Fenton's parents were actually John Fenton and Eveline Edgington (married Liverpool, 1900), as evidenced by the ship's manifest for the RMS Caronia (page 0817, line 0008), aboard which Frank Fenton arrived in the US on 21 April 1906.

Selected filmography
As actor:

 Gentle Julia (1923)
 Havoc (1925) as Babe
 Thunder Mountain (1925) as Sam Martin
 Lazybones (1925) as Dick Ritchie
 East Lynne (1925) as Richard Hare
 The Ancient Mariner (1925) as Joe Barlow
 The Road to Glory (1926) as David Hale
 Sandy (1926) as Douglas Keith
 The Shamrock Handicap (1926) as Neil Ross
 Black Paradise (1926) as James Callahan
 What Price Glory? (1926) as Lt. Moore
 The Gateway of the Moon (1928) as Jim Mortlake
 The Showdown (1928) as Kilgore Shelton
 The Drag Net (1928) as Shakespeare
 The First Kiss (1928) as Carol Talbot
 The Office Scandal (1929) as Andrew 'Andy' Corbin
 Girls Gone Wild (1929) as Boogs
 A Dangerous Woman (1929) as Peter Allerton
 The Man I Love (1929) as Carlo Vesper
 Broadway (1929) as 'Scar' Edwards
 Paris Bound (1929) as Richard Parrish
 Woman Trap (1929) as Eddie Evans
 The Last Performance (1929) as Buffo Black
 Dynamite (1929) as Young 'Vulture'
 The Man Who Came Back (1931) as Baron le Duc
 The Public Enemy (1931) as Samuel 'Nails' Nathan
 Kick In (1931) as Charlie
 Murder at Midnight (1931) as Walter Grayson
 The Pagan Lady (1931) as Gerald 'Gerry' Willis
 The Guilty Generation (1931) as Joe Palmero
 The Hatchet Man (1932) as Harry En Hai
 The Famous Ferguson Case (1932) as Jim Perrin
 The Strange Love of Molly Louvain (1932) as Nicky Grant
 Thunder Below (1932) as Webb
 Air Mail (1932) as Tony Dressel
 F.P.1 (1933) as Capt. B.E. Droste
 Night Flight (1933) as Jules' Radio Operator / Co-Pilot
 Lady Killer (1933) as Duke
 I Believed in You (1934) as Russell Storm
 Fugitive Road (1934) as Frank Riker
 Take the Stand (1934) as Hugh Halliburton
 Marie Galante (1934) as Gen. Saki Tenoki
 Strange Wives (1934) as Svengaart
 White Lies (1934) as Dan Oliver
 The Casino Murder Case (1935) as Dr. Kane
 Star of Midnight (1935) as Tim Winthrop
 Stolen Harmony (1935) as Joe Harris (uncredited)
 Chinatown Squad (1935) as Su Quong
 Men Without Names (1935) as Monk
 East of Java (1935) as Captain Wong Bo
 Two in the Dark (1936) as Stuart Eldredge
 Murder on a Bridle Path (1936) as Don Gregg
 Sworn Enemy (1936) as Steve Sherman
 The Longest Night (1936) as Carl Briggs
 House of Secrets (1936) as Barry Wilding
 China Passage (1937) as Anthony Durand
 Boys Town (1938) as Dan Farrow

As director:
 Tell No Tales (1939)
 The Man from Dakota (1940)
 The Saint's Vacation (1941)
 Whispering Smith (1948)
 Streets of Laredo (1949)
 The Redhead and the Cowboy (1951)

References
Notes

Bibliography

External links

 
 
 Leslie Fenton at Virtual History

1902 births
1978 deaths
British expatriate male actors in the United States
English male film actors
English male silent film actors
English film directors
Male actors from Liverpool
People from Montecito, California
Royal Navy officers of World War II
Burials at Santa Barbara Cemetery
20th-century English male actors
Military personnel from Liverpool
War Office personnel in World War II